Song for Mother E is the second album by American pianist Amina Claudine Myers featuring performances recorded in 1979 for the Leo label.

Reception
The Allmusic review by Michael G. Nastos awarded the album 4 stars stating "Sounds like a bigger group. Excellent".

Track listing
All compositions by Amina Claudine Myers
 "I'm Not Afraid" - 4:42   
 "3/4 Of 4/4" - 5:15   
 "Have Mercy Upon Us / Chant" - 10:50   
 "Song For Mother E" - 3:40   
 "The Real Side" - 5:50   
 "The Immortal" - 5:36   
 "Inner Destruction" - 7:36   
 "I'm Not Afraid, Refrain" - 3:09 
Recorded at Big Apple Recording Studios in New York City on October 9, 1979

Personnel
Amina Claudine Myers - piano, organ, giggle stick, voice
Pheeroan akLaff - drums, gong, little instruments, voice

References

Leo Records albums
Amina Claudine Myers albums
1980 albums